The J. Ross Robertson Cup is a Canadian ice hockey trophy. It is awarded annually in junior ice hockey to the champion of the Ontario Hockey League playoffs. It was donated by John Ross Robertson to the Ontario Hockey Association in 1910, and is the third of three similarly named trophies he established. His other eponymous trophies for the OHA include, the J. Ross Robertson Cup awarded to the annual champions of Allan Cup Hockey, and the J. Ross Robertson Cup which was awarded to the annual champions of the discontinued intermediate division.

The J. Ross Robertson Cup has continuously been awarded as the playoffs championship trophy for the top tier of junior hockey in Ontario. The cup transitioned from the Ontario Hockey Association to the Ontario Major Junior Hockey League in 1974, and has been the championship trophy of the Ontario Hockey League since 1980. The winner of the J. Ross Robertson Cup has been eligible to compete for the Memorial Cup as the junior hockey champion of Canada since 1919.

History

The J. Ross Robertson Cup was donated by John Ross Robertson on November 19, 1910, to be awarded annually to the champion of the junior ice hockey division in the Ontario Hockey Association (OHA). Robertson served as president of the OHA from 1899 to 1905, had founded the Toronto Evening Telegram in 1876, helped establish The Hospital for Sick Children, and was a member of the House of Commons of Canada for Toronto East. He was against professionalism in sports, and felt that "sport should be pursued for its own sake, for when professionalism begins, true sport ends".

The OHA first established a junior hockey division for the 1892–93 season, and the J. Ross Robertson Cup was first awarded during the 1910–11 season. The cup is the third of three similarly named trophies Robertson donated to the OHA, which included the J. Ross Robertson Cup for the annual champions of the senior division, and the J. Ross Robertson Cup for the annual champions of intermediate division.

The Memorial Cup was founded in 1919, which gave the opportunity for each season's J. Ross Robertson Cup winner to partake in national playoffs arranged by the Canadian Amateur Hockey Association for the junior hockey championship of Canada. The national playoffs culminated in an east-versus-west final, and the Eastern Canada junior champion was also awarded the George Richardson Memorial Trophy from 1932 to 1971. In 1972, the Memorial Cup format changed to a round-robin tournament and the J. Ross Robertson Cup winner received an automatic berth in the tournament along with the Quebec Major Junior Hockey League and Western Hockey League champions.

The OHA split junior hockey into A and B levels for the 1933–34 season. The junior-A level competed for the J. Ross Robertson Cup, and the junior-B level competed for the newly established Sutherland Cup. The J. Ross Robertson Cup remained the playoffs championship trophy for the top tier of junior hockey in the OHA. The cup was awarded to the OHA Major Junior A Series champion from 1972 to 1974, the Ontario Major Junior Hockey League champion from 1974 to 1980, and has been the championship trophy of the Ontario Hockey League since 1980.

The Ontario Hockey League established the Bobby Orr Trophy and the Wayne Gretzky Trophy in 1999, for the respective Eastern Conference and Western Conference champions which compete for the J. Ross Robertson Cup. The Wayne Gretzky 99 Award was established in 1999, and is given to the most valuable player of the Ontario Hockey League playoffs at the conclusion of the J. Ross Robertson Cup finals.

List of cup winners

1911 to 1932

The J. Ross Robertson Cup champion was determined by a total-goals series from 1911 to 1932. The number of games played varied by season from one to three games.

List of winning teams and finalists from 1911 to 1932.

1933 to present
Since 1933, the J. Ross Robertson Cup champion has been determined by either the most wins in total-games series, or the most points earned in a series.

List of winning teams and finalists since 1933.

Notes

References

Sources

See also
 Ed Chynoweth Cup - WHL
 President's Cup - QMJHL
 List of Canadian Hockey League awards

External links
 Ontario Hockey League

1910 establishments in Ontario
Awards established in 1910
Ontario Hockey Association
Ontario Hockey League trophies and awards